Daniel Ellis Roberts (born November 13, 1997) is an American sprinter and Hurdler.

Professional
Roberts represents Kentucky.

NCAA
Daniel Roberts is a 4-time USTFCCCA NCAA Division I All-American and 1-time Southeastern Conference champion. Roberts' 110 m hurdle time rank in the top 2 US collegian all-time. Roberts set University of Kentucky records under guidance of coach Tim Hall and previously (2016-2018) UK volunteer assistant coach/training partner Omar McLeod / Direction of coach Edrick Floréal. Roberts won 110 hurdles at 2019 Drake Relays. Daniel Roberts, who tied the Southeastern Conference meet record of 13.07 in the 110 m hurdles.

Early life and prep
Roberts is a 2016 graduate of Hampton High School. In the Fall of 2015, Roberts suffered an American football knee injury tearing his ACL, MCL, PCL and started wearing the long tights because of the surgery scars.

Daniel Roberts has a big sports family with his brothers playing NCAA football and sister Alicia Roberts ran track and played NCAA Volleyball.

References

External links
 
 Daniel Roberts profile 2018-19 Men's Track & Field Roster University of Kentucky
  (University of Kentucky results)
 
 
 
 
 

1997 births
Living people
American male sprinters
American male hurdlers
Sportspeople from Georgia (U.S. state)
Track and field athletes from Georgia (U.S. state)
People from Hampton, Georgia
Kentucky Wildcats men's track and field athletes
American male triple jumpers
African-American male track and field athletes
USA Outdoor Track and Field Championships winners
Athletes (track and field) at the 2020 Summer Olympics
Olympic track and field athletes of the United States
21st-century African-American sportspeople